Jacques-Cartier Park is a park in Gatineau, Quebec, Canada, along the Ottawa River. It is at the base of the Alexandra Bridge, facing the National Gallery of Canada in Ottawa. It is named for French explorer Jacques Cartier, who arrived at the mouth of the Ottawa River while he was looking for the Northwest Passage. The National Capital Commission (NCC) uses the site to run one of its popular annual events, Winterlude every February. It is also a busy site on Canada Day, offering activities such as music and dance shows throughout the day, entertainment and activities for children, and demonstrations by the Canadian Forces SkyHawks parachute team.

Maison Charron, the oldest surviving house in Hull, is located in the park.  It was restored by the NCC in 1985 and is used for various activities.

External links

Parks in Gatineau